Balonmano Alcobendas is a handball club based in Alcobendas, Madrid. BM Alcobendas plays in Liga ASOBAL.

Alcobendas' women's team was 4th in the 2011–12 División de Honor, qualifying for EHF competitions for the first time.

Men's team

Season by season 

7 seasons in Liga ASOBAL
13 seasons in División de Plata

Team
Squad for the 2018–19 season

Goalkeepers
 12  Adrián Torres Herrera
 30  Dzmitry Patotsky
 97  Sergio Antón Ramírez
Wingers
RW
 17  Antonio Ortega Barranco
 23  Mario Crespo Cedena
 33  Martí Villoria
LW
 7  Mikel Martín Limonge
 25  Ignacio Gimeno
Line players
 6  Admir Pelidija
 11  José Alberto López Boyarizo
 94  Javier Rodríguez Moreno

Back players
LB
 4  Santiago López García
 13  Miguel Nuñez García
 39  Asier Nieto
CB
 10  Alfonso de la Rubia
 14  Gonzalo Velasco
 77  Stefan Thorsson
 89  Mario Nevado
RB
 9  Manuel Catalina Falcón
 22  José María Gutiérrez de Corral

Women's team

Season by season

10 seasons in División de Honor

European record

Team
Squad for the 2020–21 season

Goalkeepers
  Araceli Yaryes

Wingers
RW
 
LW

Line players

 Cristina Polonio

Back players
LB
 5  Julia Díaz
CB
 8  Alba Fernández Tobías
RB
 14  Teresa Francés

Notable players

 Men
 Mikel Aguirrezabalaga
 Dalibor Čutura
 Roberto García
 Nikola Kedžo
 Jorge Maqueda
 Rade Mijatović
 Mirko Milašević
 Daisuke Miyazaki
 Olivier Nyokas
 Jesús Olalla
 Miloš Pešić
 Danijel Šarić
 Bruno Souza
 Samuel Trives
 Matthijs Vink

 Women
 Marion Anti
 Leire Aramendia
 Silvia Arderíus
 Nora Azurmendi
 Noura Ben Slama
 Emma Boada
 Yvette Broch
 Yunisleidy Camejo
 Mercedes Castellanos
 Mihaela Ciobanu
 Macarena Gandulfo
 Paula García
 Mireya González
 Marta López
 Elisabeth Pinedo
 Charris Rozemalen
 Judith Sans

References

External links
BM Alcobendas Official Website

Spanish handball clubs
Handball clubs established in 1994
Sports teams in the Community of Madrid
Sport in Alcobendas